The 1996 California Democratic presidential primary was held on March 26, 1996, in California as one of the Democratic Party's statewide nomination contests ahead of the 1996 presidential election. Incumbent President Bill Clinton easily won the primary, facing only minor opposition.

Results 

† Indicates a write-in candidate

References 

California
1996 California elections
California Democratic primaries